"Sweet Georgia Brown" is a jazz standard composed in 1925 by Ben Bernie and Maceo Pinkard, with lyrics by Kenneth Casey.

History
Reportedly, Ben Bernie came up with the concept for the song's lyrics – although he is not the credited lyricist – after meeting Dr. George Thaddeus Brown in New York City. Dr. Brown, a longtime member of the Georgia State House of Representatives, told Bernie about his daughter, Georgia Brown, and how subsequent to the baby girl's birth on August 11, 1911, the Georgia General Assembly had issued a declaration that she was to be named Georgia after the state. This anecdote would be directly referenced by the song's lyric: "Georgia claimed her – Georgia named her."

The tune was first recorded on March 19, 1925, by bandleader Ben Bernie, resulting in a five-week stretch at number one for Ben Bernie and his Hotel Roosevelt Orchestra.

One of the most popular versions of "Sweet Georgia Brown" was recorded in 1949 by Brother Bones and His Shadows and later adopted as the theme song of the Harlem Globetrotters basketball team in 1952.

Renditions

 Ben Bernie and His Hotel Roosevelt Orchestra, 1925
 California Ramblers, 1925
 Ethel Waters, 1925
 Lillie Delk Christian with Johnny St. Cyr, 1926
 Cab Calloway, 1931
 Bing Crosby recorded the song on April 23, 1932 with Isham Jones and his Orchestra and it is assessed as reaching the No. 2 spot in the charts of the day.
 Coleman Hawkins with Benny Carter and Django Reinhardt, 1937
 Django Reinhardt, 1938
 Art Tatum, 1941
 Charlie Parker and Dizzy Gillespie, 1943
 The version used by the Globetrotters is a 1949 instrumental by Brother Bones and His Shadows with whistling and bones by Brother Bones. It was adopted as the Globetrotters theme in 1952.
 Bud Powell, 1950
 Red Norvo with Charles Mingus and Tal Farlow, 1950
 Gale Storm, album Gale Storm Sings, 1956.
 Anita O'Day, Jazz on a Summer's Day, 1958
 Carol Burnett, 1960
 Tony Sheridan recorded it in December 1961 with his studio backing group, The Beat Brothers, and it was issued on his 1962 album My Bonnie. He rerecorded the song in 1964 for his next album, A Little Bit of Tony Sheridan this time backed by The Bobby Patrick Big Six but still credited to The Beat Brothers.
 The Beatles, with Roy Young, as a backup band recorded it again for Tony Sheridan on May 24, 1962, in Hamburg, Germany, using the original lyrics. This was released in Germany, on Sheridan's EP Ya Ya in 1962  and in Greece as the b-side of the single Skinny Minny. This recording was rereleased as a single in 1964 during the wave of Beatlemania with Sheridan having re-recorded the vocals with tamer lyrics and the additional verse: "In Liverpool she even dares/to criticize the Beatles' hair/With their whole fan-club standing there/oh Sweet Georgia Brown". This version can be heard on the German compilation album The Beatles' First! and its numerous reissues. The song was edited as a single for the American market with added guitar and drum parts.
 Nancy Sinatra, for the 1966 album Sugar
 Jerry Lee Lewis, for the 1970 album There Must Be More To Love Than This
 Rahsaan Roland Kirk, for the 1976 album The Return of the 5000 Lb. Man.
 Oscar Peterson, Niels-Henning Ørsted Pedersen, and Ray Brown performed the song live at the Montreux Jazz Festival, 1977
 Oscar Peterson, Live at the Blue Note, 1990
 Roberta Flack recorded "Sweet Georgia Brown" for her 1994 album Roberta: as Flack feared the song might be perceived as demeaning to women her version featured newly-added lyrics - written by Flack with her producers Jerry Barnes and Katreese Barnes - meant to establish Georgia Brown as (Roberta Flack quote:) "a strong woman who is gorgeous, sexy, strong and intelligent" rather than a pass-around girl. "Sweet Georgia Brown" has become a staple of Flack's live shows, the singer having stated that the lyric changes (Roberta Flack quote:) "cost me $25,000 so I sing [the song] whenever I have the chance."
 The hip hop group A Tribe Called Quest sampled a 1976 cover by The Singers Unlimited for their penultimate album The Love Movement on the track "Start It Up".
 Denny Zeitlin, Slickrock, 2003
 Mel Brooks used a Polish version of the song in his 1983 movie To Be or Not to Be. It is performed by himself and his wife Anne Bancroft.
 Take 6's version on the 2008 album The Standard features both whistling and vocals.
 Danny Gatton- Redneck Jazz Explosion Live in 1977 CD- The Humbler Stakes His Claim

See also
List of 1920s jazz standards

Notes and references

1925 songs
1925 singles
Basketball music
The Beatles bootleg recordings
Harlem Globetrotters
1920s jazz standards
Ella Fitzgerald songs
The Beatles with Tony Sheridan songs
Harry Connick Jr. songs
Trini Lopez songs
Sound trademarks
Songs with music by Maceo Pinkard
Songs about Georgia (U.S. state)
Cab Calloway songs
Vocalion Records singles